Cape Stallworthy (originally Svartevaeg) is the northernmost point of Axel Heiberg Island in the Qikiqtaaluk Region, Nunavut, Canada. Originally named Svartevaeg  ("black wall") by Otto Sverdrup, it was later renamed in honor of Royal Canadian Mounted Police officer Harry Stallworthy, an Arctic explorer. Frederick Cook began his 1908 North Pole journey from the cape. Cape Stallworthy is sometimes confused with Cape Thomas Hubbard on the opposite side of Eetookashoo Bay.

References
 Atlas of Canada

Headlands of Qikiqtaaluk Region